Ellis Rubin is an American actor. He is known for playing a young P. T. Barnum in the 2017 film The Greatest Showman.

Career
Rubin made his acting debut in the 2017 American musical biographical drama film The Greatest Showman. He played a young P. T. Barnum in the movie. He appeared in the 2017 television film Linda from HR. He played Victor in the 2019 romantic comedy film Ode to Joy. He also appeared in an episode of the American television comedy series The Last O.G. as Aaron.

Filmography

References

External links

Living people
American actors
2004 births